The  is the head of the local government in Okinawa Prefecture. The governor's official residence is in Okinawa Prefecture Government Building located in Naha, the capital city of the prefecture.

List of Governors of Okinawa Prefecture (1879–1945) 

Okinawa Prefecture was dissolved by United States until 1972.(see List of U.S. governors of the Ryukyu Islands).

List of Governors of Okinawa Prefecture (1972–present)

See also
United States Military Government of the Ryukyu Islands
United States Civil Administration of the Ryukyu Islands
Government of the Ryukyu Islands

Sources
World Statesmen.org

Politics of Okinawa
 
Okinawa Prefecture
Okinawa Prefecture